Below a list of all national champions in the men's 200 metres in track and field from several countries since 1970.

Argentina

1970: Andrés Calonge
1971: Pedro Bassart
1972: José Pérez Ferrería
1973: Carlos Bertotti
1974: Alfredo Milano
1975: Gustavo Dubarbier
1976: Gustavo Dubarbier
1977: Gustavo Dubarbier
1978: Carlos Gambetta
1979: Carlos Gambetta
1980: Eduardo Oscar de Brito
1981: Nicolás Duncan Glass
1982: Ernesto Braun
1983: Alfredo Muro
1984: Oscar Barrionuevo
1985: Oscar Barrionuevo
1986: Gerardo Meinardi
1987: Gabriel Somma
1988: Claudio Arcas
1989: Carlos Gats
1990: Alejandro Terzián
1991: José María Beduino
1992: Carlos Gats
1993: Carlos Gats
1994: Carlos Gats
1995: Guillermo Cacían
1996: Guillermo Cacían
1997: Carlos Gats
1998: Damián Spector
1999: Matías Fayos
2000: Nicolás Arias Duval
2001: Matías Fayos
2002: Matías Usandivaras
2003: Matías Usandivaras
2004: Matías Usandivaras
2005: Iván Altamirano
2006: Iván Altamirano

Australia

1970: Peter Norman
1971: Bruce Weatherlake
1972: Greg Lewis
1973: Greg Lewis
1974: Richard Hopkins
1975: Peter Fitzgerald
1976: Greg Lewis
1977: Colin McQueen
1978: Colin McQueen
1979: Colin McQueen
1980: Bruce Frayne
1981: Bruce Frayne
1982: Peter Gandy
1983: Bruce Frayne
1984: Peter van Miltenberg
1985: Clayton Kearney
1986: Robert Stone
1987: John Dinan
1988: Kieran Finn (IRL)
1989: Darren Clark
1990: Robert Stone
1991: Dean Capobianco
1992: Dean Capobianco
1993: Damien Marsh
1994: Steve Brimacombe
1995: Steve Brimacombe
1996: Dean Capobianco
1997: Chris Donaldson (NZL)
1998: Damien Marsh
1999: Chris Donaldson (NZL)
2000: Darryl Wohlsen
2001: Patrick Johnson
2002: David Geddes
2003: Patrick Johnson
2004: Ambroze Ezenwa (NGR)
2005: Daniel Batman
2006: Patrick Johnson
2007: Joshua Ross
2008: Daniel Batman
2009: Aaron Rouge-Serret
2010: Patrick Johnson
2011: Aaron Rouge-Serret
2012: Joseph Millar (NZL)
2013: Josh Ross
2014: Mangar Makur Chuot
2015: Banuve Tabakaucoro (FIJ)
2016: Alexander Hartmann

Bahamas

2004: Dominic Demeritte
2006: Chris Brown
2007: Michael Mathieu
2008: Jamial Rolle
2009: Jamial Rolle
2010: Jamial Rolle
2011: Michael Mathieu
2012: Trevorvano Mackey
2013: Trevorvano Mackey
2014: Shavez Hart
2015: Shavez Hart

Belarus

1992: Sergey Kornelyuk
1993: Leonid Safronnikov
1994: Leonid Safronnikov
1995: Sergey Kornelyuk
1996: Leonid Safronnikov
1997: Andrey Gavrilenko (UKR)
1998: Dmitriy Kotenkov
1999: Aleksandr Slyunkov
2000: ???
2001: Aleksandr Slyunkov
2002: Vitaliy Chechetko
2003: Maksim Pisunov
2004: Maksim Sidorenko
2005: Maksim Pisunov
2006: Maksim Pisunov

Belgium

1970: Paul Poels
1971: Jean-Pierre Borlée
1972: Freddy Lucq
1973: Guy Stas
1974: Fons Brydenbach
1975: Fons Brydenbach
1976: Reno Roelandt
1977: Lambert Micha
1978: Reno Roelandt
1979: Jacques Borlée
1980: Frank Verhelst
1981: Jacques Borlée
1982: Kris Poté
1983: Jacques Borlée
1984: Jacques Borlée
1985: Jeroen Fischer 
1986: Ronald Desruelles
1987: Jeroen Fischer
1988: Patrick Stevens
1989: Patrick Stevens
1990: Patrick Stevens
1991: Jeroen Fischer
1992: Patrick Stevens
1993: Patrick Stevens
1994: Patrick Stevens
1995: Erik Wijmeersch
1996: Patrick Stevens
1997: Erik Wijmeersch
1998: Erik Wijmeersch
1999: Erik Wijmeersch
2000: Patrick Stevens
2001: Erik Wijmeersch
2002: Cédric Van Branteghem
2003: Cédric Van Branteghem
2004: Anthony Ferro
2005: Kristof Beyens
2006: Cédric Van Branteghem
2007: Anthony Ferro
2008: Arnout Matthijs
2009: Kevin Borlée
2010: Joris Haeck
2011: Kevin Borlée
2012: Jonathan Borlée
2013: Jonathan Borlée
2014: Arnout Matthijs
2015: Arnout Matthijs
2015: Arnout Matthijs

Brazil

1991: Robson da Silva
1992: Robson da Silva
1993: Robson da Silva
1994: Robson da Silva
1995: Robson da Silva
1996: Claudinei da Silva
1997: André da Silva
1998: Claudinei da Silva
1999: Claudinei da Silva
2000: Claudinei da Silva
2001: André da Silva
2002: Vicente de Lima
2003: André da Silva
2004: André da Silva
2005: Vicente de Lima
2006: Basílio de Moraes
2007: Sandro Viana
2008: Sandro Viana
2009: Hugo de Sousa
2010: Jefferson Liberato Lucindo
2011: Bruno de Barros
2012: Bruno de Barros
2013: Bruno de Barros
2014: Aldemir da Silva Júnior
2015: Aldemir da Silva Júnior

Canada

1970: Charlie Francis
1971: Charlie Francis
1972: Robert Martin
1973: Robert Martin
1974: Robert Martin
1975: Hugh Fraser
1976: Dacre Brown
1977: Desai Williams
1978: Dan Biocchi
1979: Desai Williams
1980: Desai Williams
1981: Desai Williams
1982: Desai Williams
1983: Desai Williams
1984: Tony Sharpe
1985: Ben Johnson
1986: Atlee Mahorn
1987: Ben Johnson
1988: Cyprean Enweani
1989: Cyprean Enweani
1990: Bradley McCuaig
1991: Atlee Mahorn
1992: Ricardo Greenidge
1993: Glenroy Gilbert
1994: Robert Esmie
1995: Atlee Mahorn
1996: Dave Tomlin
1997: Robert Esmie
1998: O'Brian Gibbons
1999: Glenn Smith
2000: Pierre Browne
2001: Shane Niemi
2002: Jermaine Joseph
2003: Nicolas Macrozonaris
2004: Anson Henry
2005: Anson Henry
2006: Bryan Barnett
2007: Bryan Barnett
2008: Jared Connaughton
2009: Bryan Barnett
2010: Jared Connaughton
2011: Bryan Barnett
2012: Tremaine Harris
2013: Tremaine Harris
2014: Brendon Rodney
2015: Aaron Brown

Denmark

1970: Søren Viggo Pedersen
1971: Søren Viggo Pedersen
1972: Søren Viggo Pedersen
1973: Søren Viggo Pedersen
1974: Søren Viggo Pedersen
1975: Jens Hansen
1976: Ole Lysholt
1977: Jens Hansen
1978: Frank Foli-Andersen
1979: Jens Smedegård (Hansen)
1980: ???
1981: Jesper Carlsen
1982: ???
1983: Lars Pedersen
1984: Peter Regli
1985: Lars Pedersen
1986: Lars Pedersen
1987: Morten Kjems
1988: Lars Pedersen
1989: Lars Pedersen
1990: Miels Ole Lindberg
1991: Lars Pedersen
1992: Lars Pedersen
1993: Lars Pedersen
1994: Lars Pedersen
1995: Claus Hirsbro
1996: Claus Hirsbro
1997: Christian Trajkovski
1998: Thomas Grønnemark
1999: Christian Trajkovski
2000: Christian Birk
2001: Christian Birk
2002: Morten Jensen
2003: Mads Bangsø
2004: Morten Jensen
2005: Mads Bangsø
2006: Morten Jensen

Estonia

1918*: Johannes Villemson
1919*: Johannes Villemson
1920: Reinhold Saulmann
1921: Konstantin Pereversin
1922: Konstantin Pereversin
1923: Konstantin Pereversin
1924: Konstantin Pereversin
1925: Reinhold Kesküll
1926: Elmar Rähn
1927: Julius Tiisfeldt
1928: Edgar Labent
1929: Edgar Labent
1930: Valter Korol
1931: Valter Rattus
1932: Nikolai Küttis
1933: Rudolf Tomson
1934: Rudolf Tomson
1935: Ruudi Toomsalu
1936: Ruudi Toomsalu
1937: Ruudi Toomsalu
1938: Valter Kalam
1939: Valter Kalam
1940: Eduard Nurk
1941: -
1942: Konstantin Ivanov
1943: Konstantin Ivanov
1944: Heino Koik
1945: Aleksander Sirel
1946: Georg Gilde
1947: Georg Gilde
1948: Georg Gilde
1949: Endel Küllik
1950: Georg Gilde
1951: Georg Gilde
1952: Georg Gilde
1953: Ülo Laaspere
1954: Heino Heinlo
1955: Ursel Teedemaa
1956: Ülo Laaspere
1957: Heino Heinlo
1958: Toomas Kitsing
1959: Uno Kiiroja
1960: Eino Ojastu
1961: Kalju Jurkatamm
1962: Enno Akkel
1963: Toomas Kitsing
1964: Kalju Jurkatamm
1965: Kalju Kikamägi
1966: Kalju Jurkatamm
1967: Boris Nugis
1968: Kalju Kikamägi
1969: Viktor Kirilenko
1970: Avo Oja
1971: Ennu Laasner
1972: Rein Tõru
1973: Andres Luka
1974: Vladimir Ivaštšenko
1975: Gennadi Organov
1976: Ramon Lindal
1977: Jevgeni Jessin
1978: Gennadi Organov
1979: Gennadi Organov
1980: Ramon Lindal
1981: Mihhail Urjadnikov
1982: Ramon Lindal
1983: Mihhail Urjadnikov
1984: Mihhail Urjadnikov
1985: Andrus Möll
1986: Andrus Möll
1987: Andrus Möll
1988: Enn Lilienthal
1989: Enn Lilienthal
1990: Enn Lilienthal
1991: Andrei Morozov
1992: Rainis Jaansoo
1993: Andrei Morozov
1994: Andrus Hämelane
1995: Andrus Hämelane
1996: Rainis Jaansoo
1997: Rainis Jaansoo
1998: Urmet Uusorg
1999: Mait Lind
2000: Maidu Laht
2001: Martin Vihmann
2002: Martin Vihmann
2003: Henri Sool
2004: Martin Vihmann
2005: Martin Vihmann
2006: Marek Niit
2007: Taavi Liiv
2008: Henri Sool
2009: Marek Niit
2010: Richard Pulst
2011: Marek Niit
2012: Marek Niit
2013: Marek Niit
2014: Marek Niit
2015: Markus Ellisaar
2016: Timo Tiismaa
2017: Marek Niit
2018: Tony Nõu
2019: Ken-Mark Minkovski
2020: Henri Sai
2021: Henri Sai
2022: Karl Erik Nazarov

* unofficial championships

Finland

1970: Ossi Karttunen
1971: Markku Kukkoaho
1972: Antti Rajamäki
1973: Ossi Karttunen
1974: Ossi Karttunen
1975: Antti Rajamäki
1976: Markku Kukkoaho
1977: Ossi Karttunen
1978: Antti Rajamäki
1979: Julla Sulalampi
1980: Hannu Mykrä
1981: Kimmo Saaristo
1982: Kimmo Saaristo
1983: Kimmo Saaristo
1984: Kimmo Saaristo
1985: Kimmo Saaristo
1986: Kimmo Saaristo
1987: Juha Pyy
1988: Sakari Syväoja
1989: Kay Kyllönen
1990: Matti Heusala
1991: Jouni Myllymäki
1992: Kari Niemi
1993: Ari Pakarinen
1994: Kay Kyllönen
1995: Ari Pakarinen
1996: Ari Pakarinen
1997: Janne Hautaniemi
1998: Harri Kivelä
1999: Aleksi Sillanpää
2000: Tommi Hartonen
2001: Tommi Hartonen
2002: Tommi Hartonen
2003: Samsa Tuikka
2004: Tommi Hartonen
2005: Visa Hongisto
2006: Nghi Tran
2007: Visa Hongisto
2008: Visa Hongisto
2009: Visa Hongisto
2010: Jonathan Åstrand
2011: Santeri Tukia

France

1970: Gérard Fenouil
1971: Gérard Fenouil
1972: René Metz
1973: Lucien Sainte-Rose
1974: Joseph Arame
1975: Joseph Arame
1976: Joseph Arame
1977: Joseph Arame
1978: Pascal Barré
1979: Pascal Barré
1980: Joseph Arame
1981: Patrick Barré
1982: Herman Lomba
1983: Jean-Jacques Boussemart
1984: Jean-Jacques Boussemart
1985: Antoine Richard
1986: Bruno Marie-Rose
1987: Bruno Marie-Rose
1988: Jean-Charles Trouabal
1989: Gilles Quénéhervé
1990: Jean-Charles Trouabal
1991: Jean-Charles Trouabal
1992: Jean-Charles Trouabal
1993: Jean-Charles Trouabal
1994: Jean-Charles Trouabal
1995: Jean-Charles Trouabal
1996: Christophe Cheval
1997: Christophe Cheval
1998: Christophe Cheval
1999: Thierry Lubin
2000: Joseph Batangdon (CMR)
2001: Joseph Batangdon (CMR)
2002: Joseph Batangdon (CMR)
2003: Joseph Batangdon (CMR)
2004: Leslie Djhone
2005: Ronald Pognon
2006: David Alerte
2007: David Alerte
2008: Ronald Pognon
2009: Martial Mbandjock
2010: Christophe Lemaitre
2011: Christophe Lemaitre
2012: Christophe Lemaitre
2013: Christophe Lemaitre
2014: Christophe Lemaitre
2015: Christophe Lemaitre

Germany

East Germany

1970: Siegfried Schenke
1971: Jörg Pfeifer
1972: Siegfried Schenke
1973: Hans-Jürgen Bombach
1974: Hans-Jürgen Bombach
1975: Hans-Joachim Zenk
1976: Klaus-Dieter Kurrat
1977: Bernhard Hoff
1978: Olaf Prenzler
1979: Bernhard Hoff
1980: Bernhard Hoff
1981: Frank Emmelmann
1982: Detlef Kübeck
1983: Olaf Prenzler
1984: Frank Emmelmann
1985: Frank Emmelmann
1986: Thomas Schröder
1987: Frank Emmelmann
1988: Frank Emmelmann
1989: Steffen Schwabe
1990: Torsten Heimrath

West Germany

1970: Jochen Eigenherr
1971: Karl-Heinz Klotz
1972: Manfred Ommer
1973: Franz-Peter Hofmeister
1974: Manfred Ommer
1975: Klaus Ehl
1976: Karlheinz Weisenseel
1977: Bernd Sattler
1978: Franz-Peter Hofmeister
1979: Franz-Peter Hofmeister
1980: Christian Haas
1981: Erwin Skamrahl
1982: Erwin Skamrahl
1983: Erwin Skamrahl
1984: Ralf Lübke
1985: Ralf Lübke
1986: Ralf Lübke
1987: Christian Haas
1988: Ralf Lübke
1989: Erwin Skamrahl
1990: Peter Klein

Unified Germany

1991: Michael Huke
1992: Robert Kurnicki
1993: Robert Kurnicki
1994: Michael Huke
1995: Marc Blume
1996: Marc Blume
1997: Marc Blume
1998: Daniel Bittner
1999: Stefan Holz
2000: Holger Blume
2001: Alexander Kosenkow
2002: Marc Blume
2003: Tobias Unger
2004: Tobias Unger
2005: Tobias Unger
2006: Sebastian Ernst
2007: Daniel Schnelting
2008: Daniel Schnelting
2009: Robert Hering
2010: Daniel Schnelting
2011: Robin Erewa
2012: Julian Reus
2013: Julian Reus
2014: Robin Erewa
2015: Julian Reus

Great Britain

1970: Martin Reynolds
1971: Alan Pascoe
1972: Alan Pascoe
1973: Chris Monk
1974: Chris Monk
1975: Ainsley Bennett
1976: Glen Cohen
1977: Glen Cohen
1978: Allan Wells
1979: ???
1980: Trevor Hoyte
1981: Mike McFarlane
1982: Buster Watson
1983: Donovan Reid
1984: Todd Bennett
1985: Ade Mafe
1986: John Regis
1987: John Regis
1988: Linford Christie
1989: Marcus Adam
1990: John Regis
1991: Michael Rosswess
1992: John Regis
1993: Toby Box
1994: Solomon Wariso
1995: John Regis
1996: John Regis
1997: Marlon Devonish
1998: Douglas Walker
1999: Julian Golding
2000: Darren Campbell
2001: Marlon Devonish
2002: Marlon Devonish
2003: Julian Golding
2004: Chris Lambert
2005: Christian Malcolm
2006: Marlon Devonish
2007: Marlon Devonish
2008: Christian Malcolm
2009: Toby Sandeman
2010: Christian Malcolm
2011: Christian Malcolm
2012: James Ellington
2013: James Ellington
2014: Daniel Talbot
2015: Zharnel Hughes

India

1988: Anand Shetty
1989: Arjun Devaiah
1990: Arjun Devaiah
1991: Selvaraj Roberts
1992: Anand Natarajan
1993: Anand Natarajan
1994: 
1995: ???
1996: Amit Khanna
1997: ???
1998: Ajay Raj Singh
1999: Anil Kumar
2000: Clifford Joshua
2001: Anil Kumar
2002: Anand Menezes
2003: Piyush Kumar
2004: Anil Kumar
2005: Alaguvel Arvind

Italy

1970: Giacomo Puosi
1971: Pietro Mennea
1972: Pietro Mennea
1973: Pietro Mennea
1974: Pietro Mennea
1975: Pasqualino Abeti
1976: Pietro Mennea
1977: Pietro Mennea
1978: Pietro Mennea
1979: Pietro Mennea
1980: Pietro Mennea
1981: Giovanni Bongiorni
1982: Carlo Simionato
1983: Pietro Mennea
1984: Pietro Mennea
1985: Carlo Simionato
1986: Stefano Tilli
1987: Pierfrancesco Pavoni
1988: Stefano Tilli
1989: Sandro Floris
1990: Giovanni Puggioni
1991: Stefano Tilli
1992: Giorgio Marras
1993: Giorgio Marras
1994: Giorgio Marras
1995: Angelo Cipolloni
1996: Angelo Cipolloni
1997: Giovanni Puggioni
1998: Carlo Occhiena
1999: Maurizio Checcucci
2000: Alessandro Cavallaro
2001: Marco Torrieri
2002: Emanuele Di Gregorio
2003: Alessandro Cavallaro
2004: Alessandro Attene
2005: Koura Kaba Fantoni
2006: Stefano Anceschi
2007: Andrew Howe
2008: Matteo Galvan
2009: Roberto Donati
2010: Roberto Donati
2011: Andrew Howe
2012: Andrew Howe
2013: Diego Marani
2014: Diego Marani
2015: Davide Manenti

Jamaica

1983: Leroy Reid
1984: Gus Young
1985: ???
1986: Leroy Reid
1987: Clive Wright
1988: Clive Wright
1989: Clive Wright
1990: ???
1991: Windell Dobson
1992: Clive Wright
1993: Raymond Stewart
1994: Garth Robinson
1995: Percival Spencer
1996: Percival Spencer
1997: Percival Spencer
1998: Garth Robinson
1999: Christopher Williams
2000: Christopher Williams
2001: Christopher Williams
2002: Dwight Thomas
2003: Usain Bolt
2004: Steve Mullings
2005: Usain Bolt
2006: Asafa Powell
2007: Usain Bolt
2008: Usain Bolt
2009: Usain Bolt
2010: Asafa Powell
2011: Nickel Ashmeade
2012: Yohan Blake
2013: Warren Weir
2014: Rasheed Dwyer
2015: Nickel Ashmeade
2016: Yohan Blake
2017: Yohan Blake
2018: Jahnoy Thompson
2019: Rasheed Dwyer
2021: Rasheed Dwyer

Japan
The information taken from JAAF website.

1970: Hiromitsu Murata
1971: Takao Ishizawa
1972: Yoshiharu Tomonaga
1973: Yoshiharu Tomonaga
1974: Yoshiharu Tomonaga
1975: Yoshiharu Tomonaga
1976: Yasuhiro Harada
1977: Toshio Toyota
1978: Yoshiaki Hirose
1979: Toshio Toyota
1980: Toshio Toyota
1981: Kenji Yamauchi
1982: Toshio Toyota
1983: Susumu Takano
1984: Hiromi Kawasumi
1985: Koichi Mishiba
1986: Hirofumi Koike
1987: Kenji Yamauchi
1988: Kenji Yamauchi
1989: Yoshiyuki Okuyama
1990: Robson da Silva (BRA)
1991: Yoshiyuki Okuyama
1992: Hiroki Fuwa
1993: Michihiko Komura
1994: Kazuhiro Takahashi
1995: Koji Ito
1996: Koji Ito
1997: Masato Ebisawa
1998: Hiroyasu Tsuchie
1999: Hideki Ishizuka
2000: Hideki Ishizuka
2001: Shingo Suetsugu
2002: Hisashi Miyazaki
2003: Shingo Suetsugu
2004: Shinji Takahira
2005: Shinji Takahira
2006: Shingo Suetsugu
2007: Shingo Suetsugu
2008: Shinji Takahira
2009: Shinji Takahira
2010: Kenji Fujimitsu
2011: Shinji Takahira
2012: Kei Takase
2013: Shota Iizuka
2014: Shota Hara
2015: Kenji Fujimitsu
2016: Shota Iizuka
2017: Abdul Hakim Sani Brown
2018: Shota Iizuka
2019: Abdul Hakim Sani Brown

Latvia

1991: Aleksejs Iljušinš
1992: Vjaceslavs Kocerjagins
1993: Sergejs Inšakovs
1994: Sergejs Inšakovs
1995: Sergejs Inšakovs
1996: Sergejs Inšakovs
1997: Sergejs Inšakovs
1998: Ingūns Svikliņš
1999: Jevgênijs Dominjuks
2000: Sergejs Inšakovs
2001: Ingūns Svikliņš
2002: Sergejs Inšakovs
2003: Vadims Avdejevs
2004: Girts Lamba
2005: Sandis Sabâjevs
2006: Ronalds Arājs
2007: ???
2008: Sandis Sabâjevs
2009: Sandis Džiguns
2010: Jānis Mezītis

Lithuania

1990: Eimantas Skrabulis
1991: Kastytis Klimas
1992: Kastytis Klimas
1993: Vaidas Rabikas
1994: Andrius Vinslovas
1995: Saulius Urbutis
1996: Saulius Slavinskas
1997: Saulius Slavinskas
1998: Donatas Jakševicius
1999: Jonas Motiejûnas
2000: Jonas Motiejûnas
2001: Vytaulas Kancleris
2002: Stanislav Michno
2003: Raimondas Turla
2004: Raimondas Turla
2005: Raimondas Turla
2006: Rytis Sakalauskas
2007: Martynas Jurgilas
2008: Žilvinas Adomavičius
2009: Žilvinas Adomavičius
2010: Aivaras Pranckevičius

Netherlands

1970: Ad van Boekel
1971: Ad van Boekel
1972: Eddy Monsels (SUR)
1973: Bert de Jager
1974: Raymond Heerenveen (AHO)
1975: Sammy Monsels (SUR)
1976: Henk Brouwer
1977: Aart Veldhoen
1978: Raymond Heerenveen (AHO)
1979: Marcel Klarenbeek
1980: Henk Brouwer
1981: Henk Brouwer
1982: Mario Westbroek
1983: Diederik Everts
1984: Ahmed de Kom
1985: Ahmed de Kom
1986: Ahmed de Kom
1987: Ahmed de Kom
1988: Ahmed de Kom
1989: Rob van de Klundert
1990: Jerry Achthoven
1991: Paul Franklin
1992: Clement Moe
1993: Regillio van der Vloot
1994: Miguel Janssen (ARU)
1995: Regillio van der Vloot
1996: Patrick van Balkom
1997: Frank Perri
1998: Patrick van Balkom
1999: Patrick van Balkom
2000: Patrick van Balkom
2001: Caimin Douglas (AHO)
2002: Caimin Douglas (AHO)
2003: Patrick van Balkom
2004: Guus Hoogmoed
2005: Guus Hoogmoed
2006: Guus Hoogmoed
2007: Guus Hoogmoed
2008: Patrick van Luijk
2009: Patrick van Luijk
2010: Obed Martis
2011: Churandy Martina
2012: Jerrel Ferrer
2013: Dennis Spillekom
2014: Churandy Martina
2015: Liemarvin Bonevacia
2016: Churandy Martina
2017: Jorén Tromp

New Zealand

1970: Laurie D'Arcy
1971: Bevan Smith
1972: Bevan Smith
1973: Bevan Smith
1974: Bevan Smith
1975: Bevan Smith
1976: Terry Morrison
1977: Steve Erkkila
1978: Graeme French
1979: Shane Downey
1980: Shane Downey
1981: Shane Downey
1982: Gary Henley-Smith
1983: Gary Henley-Smith
1984: Shane Downey
1985: Dale McClunie
1986: Dale McClunie
1987: Dale McClunie
1988: Dale McClunie
1989: Dale McClunie
1990: Scott Bowden
1991: Augustine Nketia (GHA)
1992: Augustine Nketia
1993: Mark Keddell
1994: Todd Blythe
1995: Mark Keddell
1996: Matthew Coad
1997: Chris Donaldson
1998: Matthew Coad
1999: Chris Donaldson
2000: Chris Donaldson
2001: Matthew Coad
2002: Michael O'Connor
2003: Dallas Roberts
2004: Dallas Roberts
2005: James Dolphin
2006: James Dolphin
2007: James Dolphin
2008: James Dolphin
2009: J. Thumath
2010: James Dolphin
2011: Alex Jordan
2012: Joseph Millar
2013: Joseph Millar

Nigeria

2001: Uchenna Emedolu
2002: Uchenna Emedolu
2003: Uchenna Emedolu
2006: Uchenna Emedolu
2007: Obinna Metu
2008: Obinna Metu
2010: Obinna Metu
2012: Obinna Metu
2013: Ukale Elvis
2014: Ejowvokoghene Oduduru
2015: Tega Odele

Norway

1970: Richard Simonsen
1971: Richard Simonsen
1972: Audun Garshol
1973: Audun Garshol
1974: Øyvind Røst
1975: Johnny Haugen
1976: Audun Garshol
1977: Johnny Haugen
1978: Knut M. Stokke
1979: Knut M. Stokke
1980: Jens Arild Johannessen
1981: Odd Erik Kristiansen
1982: Tore Bergan
1983: Svein Erik Storlien
1984: Einar Sagli
1985: Einar Sagli
1986: Einar Sagli
1987: Jarle Løken
1988: Geir Moen
1989: Aham Okeke
1990: Aham Okeke
1991: Geir Moen
1992: Aham Okeke
1993: Geir Moen
1994: Kennet Kjensli
1995: Geir Moen
1996: Geir Moen
1997: Geir Moen
1998: Geir Moen
1999: Geir Moen
2000: John Ertzgaard
2001: John Ertzgaard
2002: Geir Moen
2003: John Ertzgaard
2004: Aham Okeke
2005: John Ertzgaard
2006: Steffen Kjønnås

Poland

1970: Zenon Nowosz
1971: Jan Werner
1972: Jerzy Czerbniak
1973: Marek Bedyński
1974: Marek Bedyński
1975: Bogdan Grzejszczak
1976: Zenon Licznerski
1977: Zenon Licznerski
1978: Leszek Dunecki
1979: Leszek Dunecki
1980: Leszek Dunecki
1981: Leszek Dunecki
1982: Czesław Prądzyński
1983: Marian Woronin
1984: Leszek Dunecki
1985: Czesław Prądzyński
1986: Czesław Prądzyński
1987: Czesław Prądzyński
1988: Czesław Prądzyński
1989: Marek Zalewski
1990: Marek Zalewski
1991: Jarosław Kaniecki
1992: Marek Zalewski
1993: Marek Zalewski
1994: Marek Zalewski
1995: Robert Maćkowiak
1996: Robert Maćkowiak
1997: Robert Maćkowiak
1998: Marcin Urbaś
1999: Marcin Urbaś
2000: Marcin Urbaś
2001: Marcin Urbaś
2002: Marcin Jędrusiński
2003: Marcin Jędrusiński
2004: Marcin Urbaś
2005: Marcin Jędrusiński
2006: Marcin Jędrusiński
2007: Marcin Jędrusiński
2008: Marcin Jędrusiński
2009: Dariusz Kuć
2010: Kamil Kryński
2011: Kamil Kryński
2012: Kamil Kryński
2013: Karol Zalewski
2014: Karol Zalewski
2015: Karol Zalewski
2016: Karol Zalewski
2017: Karol Zalewski
2018: Dominik Kopeć
2019: Dominik Kopeć

Portugal

1970: Alberto Matos
1971: Mena Antunes
1972: José Carvalho
1973: Fernando Silva
1974: António Cachola
1975: António Cachola
1976: António Cachola
1977: António Cachola
1978: António Cachola
1979: António Cachola
1980: Daniel Monteiro
1981: António Cachola
1982: Arnaldo Abrantes Sr.
1983: Luís Barroso
1984: Luís Barroso
1985: Luís Barroso
1986: Arnaldo Abrantes Sr.
1987: Luís Barroso
1988: Luís Barroso
1989: Luís Barroso
1990: Pedro Agostinho
1991: Pedro Agostinho
1992: Luís Cunha
1993: Luís Cunha
1994: Vítor Jorge
1995: Luís Cunha
1996: Carlos Calado
1997: Carlos Calado
1998: Vítor Jorge
1999: Vítor Jorge
2000: Ricardo Alves
2001: Ricardo Alves
2002: Francis Obikwelu
2003: Francis Obikwelu
2004: Arnaldo Abrantes
2005: Paulo Ferreira
2006: João Ferreira
2007: Francis Obikwelu
2008: João Ferreira
2009: João Ferreira
2010: André Biveti
2011: Yazaldes Nascimento
2012: David Lima
2013: Yazaldes Nascimento
2014: Yazaldes Nascimento
2015: Vítor Ricardo dos Santos
2016: David Lima
2017: David Lima
2018: Diogo Antunes
2019:  Miguel Alves
2020: Frederico Curvelo

Russia

1992: Aleksandr Goremykin
1993: Oleg Fatun
1994: Andrey Fedoriv
1995: Aleksandr Sokolov
1996: Andrey Fedoriv
1997: Andrey Fedoriv
1998: Vitaliy Ignatov
1999: Sergey Slukin
2000: Anton Galkin
2001: Oleg Sergeyev
2002: Oleg Sergeyev
2003: Yevgeniy Vorobyev
2004: Oleg Sergeyev
2005: Oleg Sergeyev
2006: Ivan Teplykh

South Africa

2009: Thuso Mpuang
2010: Simon Magakwe
2013: Simon Magakwe
2014: Ncincihli Titi
2015: Anaso Jobodwana
2016: Clarence Munyai

Spain
Spanish 200-metre national champions are given below.

1970: José Luis Sarriá
1971: José Luis Sarriá
1972: José Luis Sarriá
1973: José Luis Sarriá
1974: José Luis Sarriá
1975: Miguel Arnau
1976: José Luis Sarriá
1977: José Luis Sarriá
1978: José Luis Sarriá
1979: Ángel Heras
1980: Juan José Prado
1981: Javier Martínez
1982: Ángel Heras
1983: Antonio Sánchez
1984: Antonio Sánchez
1985: Juan José Prado
1986: Antonio Sánchez
1987: Antonio Sánchez
1988: Cayetano Cornet
1989: Miguel Ángel Gómez
1990: Luis Rodríguez
1991: Enrique Talavera
1992: Miguel Ángel Gómez
1993: Jordi Mayoral
1994: Frutos Feo
1995: Jordi Mayoral
1996: Jordi Mayoral
1997: Jordi Mayoral
1998: Francisco Javier Navarro
1999: Jordi Mayoral
2000: Jordi Mayoral
2001: Adrián Fernández
2002: Julián Martínez
2003: Jordi Mayoral
2004: Ángel David Rodríguez
2005: David Canal
2006: Josué Mena
2007: Javier Sanz
2008: Alberto Dorrego
2009: Ángel David Rodríguez
2010: Ángel David Rodríguez
2011: Ángel David Rodríguez
2012: Ángel David Rodríguez
2013: Bruno Hortelano
2014: Iván Jesús Ramos
2015: Bruno Hortelano
2016: Óscar Husillos
2017: Samuel García

Sweden

1970: Anders Faager
1971: Bo Söderberg
1972: Anders Faager
1973: Thorsten Johansson
1974: Thorsten Johansson
1975: Thorsten Johansson
1976: Thorsten Johansson
1977: Thorsten Johansson
1978: Thorsten Johansson
1979: Lars-Arne Ericsson
1980: Dan Orbe
1981: Eric Josjö
1982: Eric Josjö
1983: Dan Orbe
1984: Tommy Johansson
1985: Eric Josjö
1986: Tommy Björnqvist
1987: Robert Nilsson
1988: Eric Josjö
1989: Marty Krulee (USA)
1990: Torbjörn Eriksson
1991: Marty Krulee (USA)
1992: Torbjörn Eriksson
1993: Torbjörn Eriksson
1994: Lars Hedner
1995: Lars Hedner
1996: Lars Hedner
1997: Torbjörn Eriksson
1998: Torbjörn Eriksson
1999: Mikael Ahl
2000: Johan Engberg
2001: Johan Wissman
2002: Erik Wahn
2003: Johan Wissman
2004: Johan Wissman
2005: Christofer Sandin
2006: Johan Wissman

Trinidad and Tobago

1970: Keith Holder
1971: -
1972: Ainsley Armstrong
1973: Rudolph Reid
1974: Charles Joseph
1975: Charles Joseph
1976: Hasely Crawford
1977: Edwin Noel
1978: Christopher Brathwaite
1979: Michael Paul
1980: Christopher Brathwaite
1981: Anthony Munroe
1982: ???
1983: Christopher Brathwaite
1984: ???
1985: Michael Paul
1986: Ian Morris
1987: Alvin Daniel
1988: Roland Barclay
1989: ???
1990: -
1991: Roland Barclay
1992: Ato Boldon
1993: Boyd Kennedy
1994: Neil de Silva
1995: Alvin Daniel
1996: Neil de Silva
1997: Alvin Daniel
1998: Peter Frederick
1999: Jacey Harper
2000: Julien Raeburn
2001: Dion Rodriguez
2002: Marvin Regis
2003: Jacey Harper
2004: Marcus Duncan
2005: Aaron Armstrong
2006: Aaron Armstrong
2007: Emmanuel Callender
2008: Rondel Sorrillo
2009: Rondel Sorrillo
2010: Richard Thompson
2011: Rondel Sorrillo
2012: Rondel Sorrillo
2013: Lalonde Gordon
2014: Lalonde Gordon
2015: Kyle Greaux

Ukraine 

1992: Ihor Streltsov
1993: Oleksiy Chykhachov
1994: Oleksiy Chykhachov
1995: Vladyslav Dolohodin
1996: Roman Galkin
1997: Vladyslav Dolohodin
1998: Serhiy Polinkov
1999: Serhiy Osovych
2000: Serhiy Polinkov
2001: Anatoliy Dovhal
2002: Kostyantyn Rurak
2003: Yevhen Zyukov
2004: Dmytro Hlushchenko
2005: Dmytro Hlushchenko
2006: Dmytro Hlushchenko
2007: Dmytro Hlushchenko
2008: Ihor Bodrov
2009: Ihor Bodrov
2010: Oleksiy Ryemyen
2011: Ihor Bodrov
2012: Serhiy Smelyk
2013: Serhiy Smelyk
2014: Serhiy Smelyk
2015: Vitaliy Korzh
2016: Serhiy Smelyk
2017: Emil Ibrahimov
2018: Serhiy Smelyk
2019: Serhiy Smelyk
2020: Serhiy Smelyk

United States

1970: Ben Vaughan
1971: Don Quarrie (JAM)
1972: Charles Smith
1973: Steve Williams
1974: Don Quarrie (JAM)
1975: Don Quarrie (JAM)
1976: Millard Hampton
1977: Derald Harris
1978: Clancy Edwards
1979: Dwayne Evans
1980: LaMonte King
1981: Jeff Phillips
1982: Calvin Smith
1983: Carl Lewis
1984: Brady Crain
1985: Kirk Baptiste
1986: Floyd Heard
1987: Carl Lewis
1988: Larry Myricks
1989: Floyd Heard
1990: Michael Johnson
1991: Michael Johnson
1992: Michael Johnson
1993: Michael Marsh
1994: Ron Clark
1995: Michael Johnson
1996: Michael Johnson
1997: Jon Drummond
1998: Gentry Bradley
1999: Maurice Greene
2000: John Capel
2001: Shawn Crawford
2002: Darvis Patton
2003: Darvis Patton
2004: Shawn Crawford
2005: Justin Gatlin
2006: Wallace Spearmon
2007: Tyson Gay
2008: Walter Dix
2009: Shawn Crawford
2010: Wallace Spearmon
2011: Walter Dix
2012: Wallace Spearmon
2013: Tyson Gay
2014: Curtis Mitchell
2015: Justin Gatlin
2016: Justin Gatlin
2017: Ameer Webb
2018: Ameer Webb
2019: Noah Lyles

References

GBRathletics
Australian Championships
New Zealand Champions

Men
national
200 metres